Heteropanax fragrans is an evergreen plant in the Araliaceae family. The leaves of this arboreal plant are fed on by the larvae of the Eri silk moth (Samia ricini). In the Mizo language it is known as Changkhen and in Assamese it is called Keseru. The tree is found in Assam; Bangladesh; Cambodia; South Central China; China Southeast; Eastern Himalayas; Hainan; India; Myanmar; Nepal; Vietnam; Western Himalayas; Thailand.

References 

fragrans